Marilyn Rivera (born 19 February 1992) is a Guatemalan international footballer.

External links 
 

1992 births
Living people
Guatemalan women's footballers
Guatemala women's international footballers
Women's association football defenders